Proto 1 was a training biplane designed by Major Ștefan Protopopescu in collaboration with Dumitru Baziliu and Gheorghe Ticău at Arsenalul Aeronautic in Bucharest in 1922. It was the first Romanian airplane to be built in a specialized enterprise.

The first experimental flights were carried out by its designer, Ștefan Protopopescu, who held the Romanian pilot licence No.1.

Production

The Ministry of War ordered 25 aircraft on 10 January 1923 of this type from the Fabrica de avioane Astra. The Astra Factory changed the wings on its own initiative, which reduced the strength of the wings, and during an early test flight, one of the wings broke and the aircraft crashed into the Mureș river, killing the test pilot. After the accident,  production of Proto 1 aircraft was halted and improvements were made to the design, after which Astra manufactured a new variant as the Proto 2.

Specifications

References

Single-engined tractor aircraft
Aircraft first flown in 1922
Ștefan Protopopescu
1920s Romanian military aircraft
Biplanes